Shelda Kelly Bruno Bede (born January 1, 1973) is a retired beach volleyball player from Brazil.

She was born in Fortaleza, and won silver medals in beach volleyball at the 2000 Summer Olympics in Sydney and the 2004 Summer Olympics in Athens.

Sponsors
 Swatch

References

1973 births
Living people
Brazilian women's beach volleyball players
Beach volleyball players at the 2000 Summer Olympics
Beach volleyball players at the 2004 Summer Olympics
Olympic beach volleyball players of Brazil
Olympic silver medalists for Brazil
Olympic medalists in beach volleyball
Medalists at the 2004 Summer Olympics
Beach volleyball players at the 1999 Pan American Games
Sportspeople from Fortaleza
Portuguese people of Brazilian descent
Volleyball players from Rio de Janeiro (city)
Brazilian people of American descent
Brazilian people of Portuguese descent
Beach volleyball defenders
Medalists at the 2000 Summer Olympics
Pan American Games gold medalists for Brazil
Pan American Games medalists in volleyball
Medalists at the 1999 Pan American Games